ELLE atTV was a South Korean fashion channel launched in 2010 by HEM Korea, the publisher of Elle Korea. As of 2012.5.11 it ceased operations.

References 

Elle (magazine)
Television networks in South Korea
Television channels and stations established in 2009
Television channels and stations disestablished in 2012